Renegade Trail is a 1939 American Western film directed by Lesley Selander and written by John Rathmell and Harrison Jacobs. The film stars William Boyd, George "Gabby" Hayes, Russell Hayden, Charlotte Wynters, Russell Hopton, Roy Barcroft and John Merton. The film was released on August 18, 1939, by Paramount Pictures.

Plot

Cast 
 William Boyd as Hopalong Cassidy
 George "Gabby" Hayes as Windy Halliday 
 Russell Hayden as Lucky Jenkins
 Charlotte Wynters as Mary Joyce
 Russell Hopton as Bob Smoky Joslin
 Roy Barcroft as Stiff-Hat Bailey
 John Merton as Henchman Tex Traynor
 Sonny Bupp as Joey Joyce
 Eddie Dean as Singing Cowhand Red
 The King's Men as Singing Cowhands

References

External links 
 
 
 
 

1939 films
American black-and-white films
1930s English-language films
Films directed by Lesley Selander
Paramount Pictures films
American Western (genre) films
1939 Western (genre) films
Hopalong Cassidy films
1930s American films